This article details the list of girls' Little League Softball World Series winners by division. There are currently three girls' Softball World Series tournaments conducted each summer by Little League Baseball and Softball (also known as Little League International). (There are also three boys' Softball World Series tournaments played each summer.)

Little League Softball Divisions

Champions by year 

 (H) Host team

Statistics

World Series won by Country / State

Most titles by tournament 

All Time

Consecutive

Winners of three World Series tournaments in the same year 

 ^ Won at every World Series level

Winners of two World Series tournaments in the same year

References 

Junior League Softball World Series
Children's sport
Youth softball
Youth sport in the United States
Women's sport-related lists